Quito Department was one of the three departments of Gran Colombia until 1824.

It bordered Cundinamarca Department to the east.

Departments of Gran Colombia
1824 disestablishments in Gran Colombia